Klostersee (Lehnin) is a lake in Brandenburg, Germany. At an elevation of 29 m, its surface area is 0.38 km². It is located in the municipality of Kloster Lehnin, Potsdam-Mittelmark district.

See also
Lehnin Abbey

Lakes of Brandenburg
Potsdam-Mittelmark